{{DISPLAYTITLE:C5H5NO}}
The molecular formula C5H5NO (molar mass: 95.10 g/mol, exact mass: 95.03711 u) may refer to:

Pyridone
2-Pyridone
3-Pyridone
4-Pyridone
Pyridine-N-oxide

Molecular formulas